Kilmun is a linear settlement on the north shore of the Holy Loch, on the Cowal peninsula in Argyll and Bute, Scottish Highlands.It takes its name from the 7th century monastic community founded by an Irish monk, St Munn (Fintán of Taghmon). The ruin of a 12th-century church still stands beside the Kilmun Parish Church and Argyll Mausoleum.

Location

The village lies on the A880, within the Loch Lomond and The Trossachs National Park.  It runs between the head of the sea loch and connects with the village of Strone at Strone Point, where the sea loch joins the Firth of Clyde.

History

As a settlement, Kilmun is substantially older than most of its neighbours. Like them, it developed as a watering-place (a summer pleasure resort/spa with sea bathing for well off Glasgow families) after 1827, when a quay was built by the marine engineer David Napier to connect to his "new route" to Inveraray which included a steam ship on Loch Eck. The pier was a regular stop for the Clyde steamer services until its closure in 1971. A ferry also used to cross the loch to and from Lazaretto Point in Ardnadam.

Kilmun Parish Church and Argyll Mausoleum

Consists of St Munn's Church (a Category-A-listed building and Kilmun's parish church of the Church of Scotland), as well as the adjacent mausoleum of the Dukes of Argyll and a historically significant churchyard. The complex is located on the summit of a slight knoll about ten metres from the shoreline of the Holy Loch. The existing church dates from 1841 and occupies the site of an older, medieval church. A partly ruined tower from the medieval period still stands to the west of the present building.

Kilmun Arboretum

Kilmun is also home to an extensive arboretum managed by the Forestry and Land Scotland. Established in the 1930s to monitor the success of a variety of exotic tree species in the humid west coast environment, it includes specimens of Sequoia, Japanese Larch, Araucaria araucana (monkey puzzle) and Japanese Chestnut amongst many others from around the world. A series of woodland walks have been established of varying gradients and degrees of difficulty, which link by a forestry track to Benmore wood at the top of Puck's Glen.

Decline
The population for the Benmore and Kilmun area was recorded as 1,030 in the 2001 census. That showed a decline of 99 people (9.69%) in the ten years since the 1991 census.

Notable residents
Australian politician Gregor McGregor (1848–1914) was born in Kilmun.

Gallery

References

External links

 Kilmun Origins
 Kilmun Arboretum, Forest and Land Scotland - website
 Argyll Forest Park, Forest and Land Scotland - website
 Loch Lomond and Trossachs National Park, Kilmun page - website

Villages in Cowal
Arboreta in Scotland
Protected areas of Argyll and Bute
Firth of Clyde
Highlands and Islands of Scotland